Otto Knoph Rømcke (2 November 1868 – ?) was a Norwegian wholesaler and politician.

He was born in Nes to Olaf Gustav Rømcke and Agnes Marie Torgersen. He was elected representative to the Storting for the periods 1919–1921 and 1922–1924, for the Conservative Party. He served as mayor of Drammen from 1913 to 1916, and from 1916 to 1918.

References

1868 births
Year of death missing
People from Nes, Buskerud
Norwegian businesspeople
Mayors of places in Buskerud
Conservative Party (Norway) politicians
Members of the Storting
People from Buskerud